Huaytará is a town in central Peru, capital of the Huaytará Province, Huancavelica.

References

Populated places in the Huancavelica Region